Chandra Bhanu Gupta (14 July 1902 – 11 March 1980) served three terms as chief minister of Indian state of Uttar Pradesh. In 1970s he was a member of Congress (O) and Janata Party.

Early life
He was born in Atrauli, Aligarh district in 1902. Gupta joined the Indian independence movement at 17, when he took part in anti-Rowlatt Bill demonstrations in Sitapur. He was elected President of Congress Party for Lucknow in 1929.

Social contribution
Gupta was the main force behind the Motilal Nehru Memorial Society, which set up various educational, social welfare and cultural centres in Lucknow. These include Ravindralaya, Children Museum, Bal Vidya Mandir, Acharya Narendra Dev Hostel, Homeopathic Hospital, a number of Degree Colleges and a Public Library in Lucknow. Actively advised by Nirmal Chandra Chaturvedi, he introduced a number of schemes for social, cultural and educational development of the city.

Electoral politics
Chandra Bhanu Gupta won UP assembly election from Lucknow City East in 1952, defeating his Jana Sangh rival. But in 1957 he lost from the same seat to Triloki Singh of Socialist Party. Later he became Chief Minister during that assembly's five-year run. He might have won a bypoll or become MLC. In 1962 he became MLA from Ranikhet South seat. In 1967 and 1969 elections, he was elected from Ranikhet assembly seat. In 1970, he supported Tribhuvan Narayan Singh's bid to become CM of Uttar Pradesh as a member of Congress (O), but the government did not last long.

Chandra Bhanu Gupta's government in 1967 lasted only for 19 days as Charan Singh defected from Congress party with his 16 MLAs. Charan Singh was elected as leader of Samyukta Vidhayak Dal (SVD), the coalition of non-Congress parties. Charan Singh became the Chief Minister of Uttar Pradesh on 3 April 1967. On 24 July 1967, Gupta moved a no-confidence motion against the government, but the government survived.

References

External links
LU to be renamed after CB Gupta. Times of India, July 2005.

1902 births
1980 deaths
People from Aligarh district
Chief Ministers of Uttar Pradesh
Uttar Pradesh MLAs 1962–1967
Uttar Pradesh MLAs 1969–1974
Leaders of the Opposition in the Uttar Pradesh Legislative Assembly
Chief ministers from Indian National Congress
Indian National Congress (Organisation) politicians
Chief ministers from Indian National Congress (Organisation)